Jen Li-yu (born 1945) is a retired Taiwanese meteorologist who worked for the Central Weather Bureau and became the first weather presenter in Taiwan to have been trained as a meteorologist.

Career
Jen was born in 1945 and studied atmospheric science at Chinese Culture University. After completing his degree, Jen joined the Central Weather Bureau, and later led the agency's weather forecasting center. He spent 25 years with the Central Weather Bureau. Upon retiring from the agency in 1993, Jen was hired by Taiwan Television to present the weather. He was the first professional meteorologist to serve as a weather presenter in Taiwan. Prior to Jen's hiring by TTV, television stations in Taiwan would often have newscasters read data complied by the Central Weather Bureau. Jen's success as a weather presenter led many other television stations to employ dedicated weather presenters. After leaving TTV, Jen worked for China Television and Chinese Television System. Jen made his last broadcast on 31 May 2021, for TVBS.

At the 56th Golden Bell Awards ceremony for television, held in October 2021, Jen was recognized with the Golden Bell Award for special contributions. He was the first meteorologist to receive a Golden Bell accolade.

References

1945 births
Living people
Taiwanese meteorologists
Chinese Culture University alumni
Taiwanese television presenters
Television meteorologists
20th-century Taiwanese scientists
21st-century Taiwanese scientists